Phycomelaina is a genus of fungi in the family Phyllachoraceae. This is a monotypic genus, containing the single species Phycomelaina laminariae.

In Iceland, it has been reported infecting Alaria esculenta, Laminaria digitata and Saccharina latissima.

References

External links
Index Fungorum

Phyllachorales
Monotypic Sordariomycetes genera